Shawa is a village in Lower Dir District, Khyber-Pakhtunkhwa.

Location 
The village is 5 km (3 miles) away from Chakdara city, which is located near Churchill Piquet on the banks of the Swat River.

Demographics 
Its population is about 10,000, primarily Pashtun people (Pathans) speaking the Pashto language.

Shawa village consists of different , like Darbar, Bur Palau, Manz Palau,  Koz Palau, Shamlai, Koza Sha, Sero and Kaga Wala, Khwajal, Tendogag. The village consists of subtribes of Yousufzayi including the Muhammad Kayl, Bao Kayl, Haji Khyl Mulayan, Katan Kyal, Umar Khail, Buda Khail, Srakamare, Radat Khail, Fazal Khail, Gali Khail, Panda Khail, Maingan, Teelyan, Qausaryan mulayan, Tajak, Parachgan and Nayan.

Economy
The main occupation is farming and animal husbandry, evolving towards the business and transport sectors.

Afternoons are recreational activities in Kwar of Shaw located at the east side of the village. The bazaar is located near darbar masjid.

Sport 
Residents of Shawa play cricket, volleyball and soccer, and a senior cricket tournament takes place during Ramadan.

Education 
No libraries are available. Three governmental  primary schools are available.

Etymology
Multiple theories describe the village name. According to one, "Shawa" is a Hindu woman's name; an alternate theory suggests that "Shawa" is the name of the trees that can be seen there.

Climate
Rainfall in Shawa is low, and agriculture requires irrigation. The main water source is the small irrigation canal that comes known as shahban wala. The other sources are tube wells constructed by the government in a compromise that banned cocaine harvesting. The climate is mild in the summer to moderately cold in the winters. High mountains, rich in under exploited mineral resources, surround the village.

The land of shawa is divided into four main categories.
 local infrastructure mostly on the bank of the Kwar river 
 the river which has high value for sand and stone for construction
 the fields which are divided, some on the east side in the hills and some in the kwajal and the river
 the hills of shawa located at the east that range from the Tazagrame hill to the Barori hills to the Shamozi and Dara hills

See also 
 Badwan
 Chakdara
 kityari  
 Asbanr
 TendoDagh
 Ouch Adenzai

External links
Shawa
about shawa
 About TendoDagh

Populated places in Lower Dir District